The 2019–20 New Hampshire Wildcats men's basketball team represented the University of New Hampshire in the 2019–20 NCAA Division I men's basketball season. They played their home games at the Lundholm Gym in Durham, New Hampshire and were led by 15th-year head coach Bill Herrion. They finished the season 15–15, 8–8 in America East play to finish in a tie for fourth place. They lost in the quarterfinals of the America East tournament to UMBC.

Previous season
The Wildcats finished the 2018–19 season 5–24 overall, 3–13 in conference play to finish in a tie for eighth place. They failed to qualify for the 2019 America East men's basketball tournament.

Roster

Schedule and results

|-
!colspan=12 style=| Non-conference regular season

|-
!colspan=9 style=| America East Conference regular season

|-
!colspan=12 style=| America East tournament
|-

|-

Source

References

New Hampshire Wildcats men's basketball seasons
New Hampshire Wildcats
New Hampshire Wildcats men's basketball
New Hampshire Wildcats men's basketball